Harrison is a city in western Hamilton County, Ohio, United States. The population was 12,563 at the 2020 census. It is part of the Cincinnati metropolitan area.

History

Harrison was laid out in 1810, named in honor of William Henry Harrison, a decorated general and state legislator and afterward the ninth president of the United States. It was incorporated in 1850 and became a city in 1981.

Harrison Township was established in 1850, formerly part of Crosby Township. Among the historic sites in the city's vicinity is the Eighteen Mile House, which was built during the earliest years of the nineteenth century.

Harrison was the home of Ohio's fifth governor Othneil Looker.

On July 13, 1863, Morgan's Raiders, a Confederate cavalry force, invaded. The column passed through taking fresh horses and burning the bridge over the Whitewater River near the southwest part of the town. The first train came to Harrison Township in 1864. In 1882 Harrison Depot was built at West Broadway and Railroad Avenue. It later burned to the ground.

Harrison Village Park is the final resting place for a small number of veterans of the Revolutionary War. In the center of the park is a bandstand, built in the early 1930s on the site of a fountain that had been drained and filled in. It seems many children came down with cases of impetigo after spending a hot summer swimming in the fountain full of untreated water. 

In 1940 the dog track in West Harrison closed due to pressure from the horse racing circuit. Monkeys in silk jackets had been used as jockeys for the dogs. The track had originally opened in 1932, when parimutuel betting was illegal in Indiana. However, during the Depression, heads were turned as the track attracted revenue to the area and was one of the highest paying local jobs at $12 a week.

Parts of the city were devastated on June 2, 1990, by an F4 tornado, but were quickly rebuilt. The American Watchmakers-Clockmakers Institute is headquartered in Harrison.

Harrison is home to the headquarters of the American Watchmakers-Clockmakers Institute.

Geography
Harrison is located in northwestern Hamilton County at  (39.257931, -84.804535). It is bordered to the west by the town of West Harrison, Indiana.

Interstate 74 passes through the city, east of the downtown area, with access from Exits 1 and 3. I-74 leads southeast  to Cincinnati and northwest  to Indianapolis.

Harrison is adjacent to Miami Whitewater Forest, the second park to join the Hamilton County Park District in 1949. It now spans .

Demographics

2010 census
At the 2010 census there were 9,897 people in 3,765 households, including 2,659 families, in the city. The racial makeup of the city was 97.6% White, 0.3% African American, 0.2% Native American, 0.6% Asian, 0.5% from other races, and 0.8% from two or more races. Hispanic or Latino of any race were 1.1%.

Of the 3,765 households, 37.8% had children under the age of 18 living with them, 51.7% were married couples living together, 13.8% had a female householder with no husband present, 5.2% had a male householder with no wife present, and 29.4% were non-families. 23.7% of households were one person, and 9.3% were one person aged 65 or older. The average household size was 2.63 and the average family size was 3.12.

The median age was 34.7 years. 26.2% of residents were under the age of 18; 9.9% were between the ages of 18 and 24; 28.1% were from 25 to 44; 24.3% were from 45 to 64; and 11.3% were 65 or older. The gender makeup of the city was 48.7% male and 51.3% female.

2000 census
At the 2000 census there were 7,487 people in 2,717 households, including 2,005 families, in the city. The population density was 2,024.5 people per square mile (781.3/km2). There were 2,847 housing units at an average density of 769.8 per square mile (297.1/km2).  The racial makeup of the city was 98.18% White, 0.17% African American, 0.09% Native American, 0.39% Asian, 0.01% Pacific Islander, 0.20% from other races, and 0.95% from two or more races. Hispanic or Latino of any race were 0.52%.

Of the 2,717 households, 41.4% had children under the age of 18 living with them, 57.6% were married couples living together, 11.7% had a female householder with no husband present, and 26.2% were non-families. 22.3% of households were one person, and 8.6% were one person aged 65 or older. The average household size was 2.75 and the average family size was 3.26.

In the city the population was spread out, with 29.9% under the age of 18, 9.9% from 18 to 24, 31.4% from 25 to 44, 19.4% from 45 to 64, and 9.3% 65 or older. The median age was 32 years. For every 100 females, there were 93.7 males. For every 100 females age 18 and over, there were 91.3 males.

The median household income was $46,107 and the median family income was $54,028. Males had a median income of $37,455 versus $27,418 for females. The per capita income for the city was $17,966. About 4.3% of families and 6.8% of the population were below the poverty line, including 5.6% of those under age 18 and 5.0% of those age 65 or over.

Religion

The Roman Catholic Parish of Saint John the Baptist was seen to be established in 1851. During the 1970s, the demographics of Harrison began to change dramatically with the completion of I-74 and the I-275 loop around Cincinnati leading to a growing number of people going to the parish.

Government
Harrison Mayor William Neyer was elected November 3, 2015.

Harrison city council is made up of seven members: Tony Egner, Lexis Dole, Jean Wilson, Jerry Wilson, Ryan Grubbs, Ryan Samuels, and Mike Mains.  Clerk of council is Risa Dole.

Its police department is an accredited department with 20 sworn officers and three civilian personnel. It is headed by Col. Charles Lindsey, Chief of Police.

The fire department is headed by Chief Rob Hursong. The Harrison Fire Department is a combination department with 49 employees, 22 of whom are full-time and 27 part-time.

Education
 William Henry Harrison High School is located in Harrison. The school is part of the Southwest Local School District, which encompasses Harrison Township, Crosby Township, and Whitewater Township in Hamilton County as well as a small section of Morgan Township in southwest Butler County.
 Cincinnati State Technical and Community College West Campus is located in Harrison.
 St. John the Baptist Harrison is a Roman Catholic school. There are 305 students in the school from preschool through eighth grade. The athletic nickname for the school is the Jaguars. The official colors are red and black.

Notable people
 Harriet Ball Dunlap, temperance leader

See also
 Whitewater Canal

References

External links
 Harrison, OH Official Website
 Southwest Local School District

 
Cities in Ohio
Cities in Hamilton County, Ohio
1810 establishments in Ohio